David McCreery (born 16 September 1957) is a Northern Irish former professional footballer who played for Newcastle United and many other clubs during his long career.

He mostly played in midfield, but was very versatile, and during his career played in every position bar goalkeeper. McCreery made 67 appearances for the Northern Ireland national football team, and played in the World Cup finals of 1982 and 1986. He was named in the All Star Select XI at the World Cup 1982 for his continuous high quality performances.

McCreery started his career with Manchester United, where he was a used substitute as they won the 1977 FA Cup and FA Charity Shield. After scoring eight goals for the club, he transferred to Queens Park Rangers for £200,000 in 1979. In 1981, he joined Tulsa Roughnecks of the North American Soccer League playing both the 1981 and 1982 summer seasons in the United States. He also played in the 1981–82 winter indoor league for Tulsa, netting two goals.

In 1982, he was transferred to Newcastle United where he gained promotion in the 1983–84 season, before shorter spells at Heart of Midlothian and Hartlepool United.

He would later manage Carlisle United and Hartlepool, in the English Division 2. His greatest success at these clubs came in 1993–94, when he guided Carlisle to a place in the Division Three playoffs, where they were eliminated in the semi-finals by eventual winners Wycombe Wanderers. He won Manager of the Month Award twice within his tenure at the club. He then joined Hartlepool United but was unable to win promotion and resigned after one season to initiate Major League Soccer in America. Within the MLS role, McCreery worked with Bruce Arena, Dave Sarachan and Rinus Michels, coaching and then selecting suitable players to raise the profile of the MLS in its inaugural season and beyond.

His knowledge of global soccer and networks led McCreery to join a United States-based soccer management company, then he became European Consultant for Boca Juniors and scouted for a number of Premier and Championship League clubs in England.

McCreery was named head coach of Myanmar National League club Magway FC in late 2010. Straight away, he established a strong youth development programme at the club, and this resulted in five squad players being called up to the Myanmar U22 squad. After two years in Burma, McCreery moved to Malaysia to take charge of the Sabah state team in the Malaysian Premier League.  After leading the club to a Malaysia Cup playoff spot, he resigned from the role in July 2013.

Honours
Manchester United
FA Cup: 1976–77
FA Charity Shield: 1977

References

External links

Northern Ireland Footballing Greats profile

1957 births
1982 FIFA World Cup players
1986 FIFA World Cup players
Association footballers from Northern Ireland
Association football utility players
Carlisle United F.C. managers
Carlisle United F.C. players
Expatriate association footballers from Northern Ireland
Expatriate sportspeople from Northern Ireland in Sweden
Expatriate sportspeople from Northern Ireland in the United States
Expatriate soccer players in the United States
Expatriate footballers in Sweden
Football managers from Northern Ireland
GIF Sundsvall players
Hartlepool United F.C. managers
Hartlepool United F.C. players
Heart of Midlothian F.C. players
Living people
Manchester United F.C. players
Newcastle United F.C. players
North American Soccer League (1968–1984) players
North American Soccer League (1968–1984) indoor players
Northern Ireland international footballers
Sabah F.C. (Malaysia) managers
Association footballers from Belfast
Queens Park Rangers F.C. players
Scottish Football League players
English Football League managers
English Football League players
Tulsa Roughnecks (1978–1984) players
People educated at Ashfield Boys' High School
Allsvenskan players
Association football midfielders
Expatriate sportspeople from Northern Ireland in Malaysia
Expatriate sportspeople from Northern Ireland in Myanmar
FA Cup Final players